The Iraq Football Association (IFA) is the governing body of football in Iraq, controlling the Iraqi national team and the Iraqi Premier League. The Iraqi Football Association was founded in 1948 and has been a member of FIFA since 1950, the Asian Football Confederation since 1970, and the Sub-confederation regional body West Asian Football Federation since 2001. Iraq is also part of the Union of Arab Football Associations (founded in 1974) and the Arab Gulf Cup Football Federation (founded in 2016). The Iraqi team is commonly known as Usood Al-Rafidain, which literally means Lions of Mesopotamia.

History
The Iraqi Football Association (Ittihad Al-Iraqi Le-Korat Al-Kadem) was formed on October 8, 1948, and was the third sports union to be founded in Iraq after the Track and Field Athletics and the Basketball Federations. The two unions took part at the 1948 Olympic Games in London, held from July 29 to August 14, however the Iraqi FA had not been founded, so no football team took part in the Olympics. It was during the Olympics that the idea of an Iraq Football Association was put forward. During the 1948 London Olympic Games, Iraq's basketball team lost every game by an average of 104 points per game. They scored an average of 23.5 points per game. The team included Iraq's first ever-national football captain Wadud Khalil and another member of Iraq's first ever-national squad in 1951, the outside right Salih Faraj.

First administration
The first Iraqi FA administration was headed by President Obaid Abdullah Al-Mudhayfi and Saadi Jassim as general secretary, with its headquarters in the Sheikh Omar district in Baghdad. The IFA was an association of 14 teams from all over Iraq, they included the Royal Olympic Club (‘Nadi Al-Malikiya Al-Olympiya’), Royal Guards (‘Haris Al-Maliki’), Royal Air Force (‘Al-Quwa Al-Jawiya Al-Malikiya’), Police Schools (‘Madaris Al-Shurta’), Kuliya Al-Askariya (‘Military College’), Dar Al-Mualameen Alaliya (‘Highest Teacher's House’), Casual's Club, Al-Marouf Al-Tarbiya (‘Physical Education’), Kuliya Al-Hakok (‘College of Law’), Quwa Al-Siyara (‘Armoured Cars’) from the capital Baghdad and four other teams Nadi Al-Minaa Al-Basri (Basra Port Club), Sharakat Al-Naft Al-Basra (Basra Petroleum Company) from Basra and branches in the provinces of Mosul and Kirkuk.

Controversies

The Iraqi youth national teams have been ejected from tournaments for fielding over-age players. In 1989, Iraq was banned for using over-age players in the U-20 World Championships in Saudi Arabia. That ban was extended when Iraq invaded Kuwait in August 1990.

Competitions
The IFA organises several national competitions:
 Iraqi Premier League
 Iraq Division One
 Iraq Division Two
 Iraq Division Three
 Iraq FA Cup
 Iraqi Super Cup
 Iraqi Women's Football League

Current title holders

Association information
As of September 2021, the members of the Iraq Football Association leadership team are:

Other members:

Govand Abdulkhaliq, Raheem Lafta, Ahmed O. Zamil, Firas Nori, Mohammed Naser, Ghalib Abbas, Yahya Zghair, Khalaf Jalal, Ghanim Oraibi, Rasha Talib

List of presidents of IFA
The following is a list of presidents of Iraq Football Association (IFA).

See also
 Iraq national football team
 Iraqi football league system
 List of Iraqi football champions

References

External links
Official website  
Iraq  at FIFA site
Iraq  at AFC site

Football in Iraq
Football
Asian Football Confederation member associations
Sports organizations established in 1948
1948 establishments in Iraq